Mallotophenone is a dimeric phloroglucinol found in Mallotus oppositifolius or in Mallotus japonicus.

The bioassay-guided fractionation of an ethanol extract of the leaves and inflorescence of M. oppositifolius collected in Madagascar led to the isolation of the two new bioactive dimeric phloroglucinols mallotophenone, together with mallotojaponins B and C. These compounds show antiproliferative and antiplasmodial activities.

References 

Phloroglucinols
Natural phenol dimers